Roger Cradock, O.F.M was a bishop in the second half of the 14th Century.

Craddock was appointed Bishop of Waterford on 2 March 1350. He received possession of the temporalities on 17 August 1350 and again 10 May 1352. Cradock was translated to Llandaff in December 1361; and died on 22 June 1382.

References

Bishops of Llandaff

1382 deaths
14th-century Roman Catholic bishops in Ireland
Bishops of Waterford